AW Canum Venaticorum is a variable star in the constellation Canes Venatici. It is visible to the naked eye with a nominal apparent visual magnitude of 4.76. It is moving closer with a heliocentric radial velocity of −44 km/s.

At the age of 1.1 billion years, this is an evolved red giant star with a stellar classification of M3- IIIa. It is a slow irregular variable of type Lb, with a brightness that ranges between magnitudes 4.73 and 4.85. The star has 2.2 times the mass of the Sun and has expanded to 117 times the Sun's radius. It is radiating 2,387 times the Sun's luminosity from its enlarged photosphere at an effective temperature of 3,529 K.

References

M-type giants
Semiregular variable stars
Canes Venatici
Durchmusterung objects
120933 
067665 
5219
Canum Venaticorum, AW